Kneale is a surname of Manx origin. The name is an Anglicisation of the Gaelic Mac Néill, meaning "son of Niall".

People
Bryan Kneale, (born 1930), Manx, an artist and sculptor
Campbell Kneale, a New Zealand musician who formed Birchville Cat Motel
Jane Heal (née Kneale), (born 1946), British philosopher
Kneale Kermeen,  (born 1990), Manx motorcycle racer
Martha Kneale (née Hurst), (1909-2001), British philosopher
Matthew Kneale, (born 1960), British writer, 
Nigel Kneale, (1922–2006), Manx writer
Patricia Kneale, (born 1925), British film and television actress
Paul Kneale, (born 1986), Canadian Artist
Tim Kneale, British sport shooter
Victor Kneale, (died 2007), Manx, politician
William Kneale, (1906–1990), English logician.

Other uses
'Les Kneale', a cultivar (Buddleja davidii).
Joshua A. Kneale, Carpenter

See also
 Neal, Neil, MacNeil, McNeil, Neale, Neill, Nelson, O'Neill,

References

Surnames of Manx origin
Manx-language surnames
English-language surnames
Patronymic surnames